Simon Kick (1603, Delft – 1652, Amsterdam), was a Dutch Golden Age painter.

Biography
According to the RKD he was the son of the Delft varnish worker Willem Kick. He married Christina (Stijntje) Duyster, who he got engaged to on the same day that her brother, the painter Willem Duyster got engaged to Simon's sister Margrieta. Simon and Stijntje became the parents of the painter Cornelis Kick. He is known for portraits and genre works with soldiers and horsemen.

References

Simon Kick on Artnet

1603 births
1652 deaths
Dutch Golden Age painters
Dutch male painters
Artists from Delft